Huỳnh Thanh Mỹ (March 29, 1938 – October 10, 1965) was a Vietnamese photographer working for the Associated Press. While covering a fight between the Viet Cong and SVN Rangers in the Mekong Delta, Huynh Thanh My was wounded in the chest and arm. He was shot while awaiting medical evacuation for his wounds when the Viet Cong overran the makeshift aid station of a South Vietnamese army position. Huynh left behind his 19-year-old widow and seven-month-old daughter. Later his wife and the already 10-year-old daughter were evacuated to Los Angeles when the war ended.

Huỳnh Thanh Mỹ was the older brother of photojournalist Nick Ut.

References

1938 births
1965 deaths
Associated Press photographers
People from Long An Province
Vietnamese photographers
War photographers killed while covering the Vietnam War